Greg Martin (born in September 1981 in Dallas, Texas) is a cybersecurity expert and entrepreneur. He is the co-founder of cyber-security company Anomali and is the co-founder and CEO of cyber security company JASK. Martin is credited with inventing the first Threat Intelligence Platform (TIP), and is the creator of the popular open source Honeypot project “Modern Honey Network”.

Early life and education 
Martin grew up in working-class Waxahachie, Texas.

Martin, a self proclaimed autodidact, taught himself taught himself to write code on his family's first personal computer, an IBM 8086 clone. He was a teenage computer hacker, pulling pranks like creating a program to flood the local Domino's Pizza with bogus calls and infiltrating his high school's servers, programming the computers to shut off simultaneously.

Career 
At age 16, while still in high school, Martin ran the local dial-up Internet service provider. After graduating high school, he moved to Dallas, Texas, to work as a network engineer.

In his mid-twenties, he taught a computer security course for NASA.  During this time he also acted as a cyber-security advisor for the U.S. Secret Service and the Federal Bureau of Investigation (FBI), helping the organizations track and shut down criminal networks.

In 2009, Martin became a cyber-security consultant for leading SIEM company ArcSight (which was later acquired by Hewlett-Packard).

In 2012, he left HP (Arcsight) and founded cloud security company ThreatStream Inc. (now known as Anomali), in Redwood City, California.

In 2015, Martin launched cloud security and artificial intelligence company JASK in San Francisco. He currently serves as CEO.

Boards and honors 
Martin serves as an independent board director of SOC Prime Inc, Advisory Board of Anomali, Inc. and Acalvio Technologies.

Patents 
Martin was awarded two United States patents in computer and network security: 
United States Patent 10867034 "Method for detecting a cyber attack"
United States Patent 10855715 "Method for predicting security risks of assets on a computer network"

Commentary and contributions 
Martin serves as a cybersecurity industry resource, and is often quoted in industry news stories on a variety of topics, from high-profile data breaches to government cybersecurity.

References

Computer security specialists
People from Dallas
Living people
1981 births